The Brandenburg Commercial District, on Main St. in Brandenburg, Kentucky, is a  historic district which was listed on the National Register of Historic Places in 1986.  It included seven contributing buildings.

It includes:
Ace Theatre
Dr. Blair Building
Brandenburg Moose Lodge (formerly Applegate Ford Motor Company)
F. W. Casperke Building
Farmers' Deposit Bank Building
Hotel Meade
Meade County Messenger Building

References

National Register of Historic Places in Meade County, Kentucky
Gothic Revival architecture in Kentucky
Commercial buildings on the National Register of Historic Places in Kentucky
Brandenburg, Kentucky